Shala e Bajgorës is a mountainous (hilly) region in Kosovo, that lies between the valley of the river Ibar and Llap, at the foot of the Kopaonik, concentrated primarily around cities, Vushtrri and Mitrovica, and towns Trepça and Stanberg, with village of Bajgora being the largest of their 37 settlements.

Notable People 
 Bislim Bajgora
 Isa Boletini

See also 
 Bajgora
 Shala (tribe)

References

External links 

 Shala of Bajgora (visitkosovo.rks.net)

Regions of Kosovo
Albanian ethnographic regions
Kosovo Ethnographic Regions